Novosyolka is a rural locality (a village) in Razdolyevskoye Rural Settlement, Kolchuginsky District, Vladimir Oblast, Russia. The population was 115 as of 2010.

Geography 
The village is located 5 km north-west from Razdolye, 5 km east from Kolchugino.

References 

Rural localities in Kolchuginsky District